"Who put Bella down the Wych Elm?" is graffiti that appeared in 1944 following the 1943 discovery by four children of the skeletonised remains of a woman inside a wych elm in Hagley Wood, Hagley (located in the estate of Hagley Hall), in Worcestershire, England. The victim—whose murder is estimated to have occurred in 1941—remains unidentified, and the current location of her skeleton and autopsy report is unknown.

Discovery
On 18 April 1943, four local boys (Robert Hart, Thomas Willetts, Bob Farmer and Fred Payne) were poaching or bird–nesting in Hagley Wood, part of the Hagley estate belonging to Lord Cobham near Wychbury Hill when they came across a large wych elm. Thinking the location to be a particularly good place to search for birds' nests, Farmer attempted to climb the tree to investigate. As he climbed, he glanced down into the hollow trunk and discovered a skull. At first he believed it to be that of an animal, but after seeing human hair and teeth, he realised that he had found a human skull. As they were on the land illegally, Farmer put the skull back and all four boys returned home without mentioning their discovery to anybody. However, on returning home, the eldest of the boys, Willetts, felt uneasy about what he had witnessed and decided to report the find to his parents.

Investigation 

When police checked the trunk of the tree they found an almost complete skeleton, with a shoe, a gold wedding ring, and some fragments of clothing. The skull was valuable evidence, in that it still had some tufts of hair and had a clear dental pattern, despite some missing teeth. After further investigation, the remains of a hand were found some distance from the tree.

The body was sent for forensic examination by James Webster. He quickly established that it was that of a female who had been dead for at least 18 months, placing time of death in or before October 1941; Webster also discovered a section of taffeta in her mouth, suggesting that she had died from suffocation. From the measurement of the trunk in which the body had been discovered, he also deduced that it must have been placed there "still warm" after the killing, as it could not have fitted once rigor mortis had taken hold.

Police could tell from items found with the body what the woman had looked like, but with so many people reported missing during the Second World War, records were too numerous for a proper identification to take place. They cross-referenced the details they had with reports of missing persons throughout the region, but none of them seemed to match the evidence. In addition, they contacted every dentist in the area since the dentistry was quite distinctive.

In late December 1943, a graffiti message, related to the mystery, appeared on a wall in Upper Dean Street, Birmingham, reading Who put Luebella down the wych elm – Hagley Wood. This provided investigators with several new leads for tracing who the victim could have been. Other messages in the same hand appeared too. Since at least the 1970s, similar graffiti has sporadically appeared on the Hagley Obelisk near to where the woman's body was discovered, which asks the slightly modified Who put Bella in the Witch Elm?.

Facial reconstruction 

An episode of the television programme Nazi Murder Mysteries described a forensic facial reconstruction undertaken by the Liverpool John Moores University's "Face Lab", from photographs of the skull. It was commissioned by Andrew Sparke, for his books on the incident.

Theories 

In a Radio 4 programme first broadcast in August 2014, Steve Punt suggested two possible victims. One possible victim was reported to the police in 1944 by a Birmingham sex worker. In the report, she stated that another sex worker called Bella, who worked on the Hagley Road, had disappeared about three years previously. The name “Bella” (or “Luebella”) suggested the graffiti writer was probably aware of the identity of the victim.

A second possibility came from a statement made to police in 1953 by Una Mossop, in which she said that her ex-husband Jack Mossop had confessed to family members that he and a Dutchman called van Ralt had put the woman in the tree. Mossop and van Ralt met for a drink at the Lyttelton Arms (a pub in Hagley). Later that night, Mossop said the woman became drunk, and passed out while they were driving. The men put her in a hollow tree in the woods in the hope that in the morning she would wake up and be frightened into seeing the error of her ways. Jack Mossop was confined to a Stafford mental hospital because he had recurring dreams of a woman staring out at him from a tree. He died in the hospital before the body in the wych elm was found. The likelihood of this being the correct explanation is questioned because Una Mossop did not come forward with this information until more than 10 years after Jack Mossop's death.

Another theory comes from an MI5 declassified file about Josef Jakobs – the last man to be put to death in the Tower of London, on 15 August 1941. An Abwehr agent, he parachuted into Cambridgeshire in 1941 but broke his ankle when landing and was soon arrested by the Home Guard. On his person was found a photo purportedly of his lover, a German cabaret singer and actress named Clara Bauerle. Jakobs said that she was being trained as a spy and that, had he made contact, she might have been sent over to England after him. In September 2016, it was determined that Clara Bauerle had died in Berlin on 16 December 1942.

In 1945, Margaret Murray, an anthropologist and archaeologist at University College, London, proposed a more radical theory—witchcraft—because she believed that the severing of one hand was consistent with a ritual called the Hand of Glory, after the victim had been killed by Romani people during an occult ritual. Her ideas excited the local press and led investigators to consider another seemingly ritualistic killing of a man, Charles Walton, in nearby Lower Quinton.

In 1953, another theory surfaced, namely that the victim was a Dutchwoman named Clarabella Dronkers, and she had been killed by a German spy-ring consisting of a British officer, a Dutchman and a music hall artist, for "knowing too much". Available records and evidence were unable to support the story.

Notes

References

External links
"Who Put Bella in the Wych Elm" article on Atlas Obscura
Who Put Bella in the Wych Elm, article from Brian Haughton's website
Casefile True Crime Podcast - Case 04 - Who Put Bella In The ‘Witch’ Elm - 30 January 2016
Bella in the Wych Elm- Christmas and Crime, Confessed Obsessed podcast

1943 murders in the United Kingdom
1941 in England
1941 murders in the United Kingdom
1943 in England
April 1943 events
1944 works
20th century in Worcestershire
Graffiti in England
Female murder victims
Unidentified murder victims
Unidentified murder victims in the United Kingdom
Unsolved murders in England
Murder in the West Midlands (county)
Hagley Hall